Currency Museum may refer to:
Currency Museum (Bahrain), a currency museum in the Central Bank of Bahrain
Bank of Canada Museum, a currency museum at the Bank of Canada headquarters
Currency museum, Colombo, a currency museum in Sri Lanka
Currency Museum of the Bank of Japan, a currency museum in front of the Bank of Japan
Bank of Jamaica Currency Museum